Eduardo Sastre (born 22 September 1910, date of death unknown) is an Argentine fencer. He competed at the 1952 Summer Olympics.

References

1910 births
Year of death missing
Argentine male fencers
Argentine foil fencers
Olympic fencers of Argentina
Fencers at the 1952 Summer Olympics
Pan American Games medalists in fencing
Pan American Games silver medalists for Argentina
Fencers at the 1951 Pan American Games